Moderation is the process of eliminating or lessening extremes.

Moderation can also refer to:

 Moderation (statistics), when the relationship between two variables depends on a third variable
 Moderation (Internet), the practice of managing discussion on an online forum
 Moderation (game), the practice of refereeing multiplayer role-playing games
 "Moderation" (song), by Florence and the Machine
 The role of a neutron moderator in a nuclear reactor

See also 
 Moderate, a middle position in a left/right political system